Brandie or Brandee is a given name. Notable persons with that name include:

 Brandie Burton (born 1972), an American golfer
 Brandie Coleman (born  1985), American murder victim
 Brandie Jay (born 1993), American artistic gymnast
 Brandie O'Connor (born 1973), Australian vision impaired paracyclist
 Brandie Wilkerson (born 1992), Swiss-American, naturalized Canadian volleyball player
 Brandee Younger, American harpist

See also
 Brandi
 Brandy (given name)